Urea nitrate is a fertilizer-based high explosive that has been used in improvised explosive devices in Afghanistan, Pakistan, Iraq, and various terrorist acts elsewhere in the world such as in the 1993 World Trade Center bombings. It's chemical formula is CH5N3O4 or (NH2)2COHNO3. 

Urea nitrate is produced in one step by reaction of urea with nitric acid.  This is an exothermic reaction, so steps must be taken to control the temperature.

Urea nitrate explosions may be initiated using a blasting cap.

Chemistry
Urea contains a carbonyl group. The more electronegative oxygen atom pulls electrons away from the carbon forming a greater electron density around the oxygen, giving the oxygen a partial negative charge and forming a polar bond. When nitric acid is presented,  it ionizes. A hydrogen cation contributed by the acid is attracted to the oxygen and forms a covalent bond [electrophile H+]. The electronegative NO3− ion then is attracted to the positive hydrogen ion. This forms an ionic bond and hence the compound urea nitrate.

(NH2)2CO (aq) + HNO3 (aq) → (NH2)2COHNO3 (s)

The compound is favored by many amateur explosive enthusiasts as a principal explosive for use in larger charges. In this role it acts as a substitute for ammonium nitrate based explosives. This is due to the ease of acquiring the materials necessary to synthesize it, and its greater sensitivity to initiation compared to ammonium nitrate based explosives.

References

Further reading

External links

Explosive chemicals
Nitrates
Ureas